Pottery is a Canadian five-piece indie rock/garage punk band from Montreal, Quebec, composed of Austin Boylan, guitarist Jacob Shepansky, keyboardist Peter Baylis, drummer Paul Jacobs and bassist Tom Gould. They released their debut single Hank Williams on November 28, 2018, which was later included in their 2019 extended play No. 1. On June 26, 2020, the band released their first full-length album, Welcome to Bobby's Motel.

Discography
Studio albums

Extended plays

Singles
2018 - "Hank Williams"

Videography

References

External links 
Pottery official website

Pottery on Partisan Records

Canadian art rock groups
Canadian indie rock groups
Canadian garage rock groups
Canadian punk rock groups
Canadian post-punk music groups
Partisan Records artists
Musical groups established in 2017
Musical groups from Montreal
2017 establishments in Quebec